Allyl isothiocyanate (AITC) is an organosulfur compound (formula CH2CHCH2NCS). The colorless oil is responsible for the pungent taste of mustard, radish, horseradish, and wasabi. This pungency and the lachrymatory effect of AITC are mediated through the TRPA1 and TRPV1  ion channels. It is slightly soluble in water, but more soluble in most organic solvents.

Biosynthesis and biological functions
Allyl isothiocyanate can be obtained from the seeds of black mustard (Brassica nigra) or brown Indian mustard (Brassica juncea). When these mustard seeds are broken, the enzyme myrosinase is released and acts on a glucosinolate known as sinigrin to give allyl isothiocyanate.
This serves the plant as a defense against herbivores; since it is harmful to the plant itself , it is stored in the harmless form of the glucosinolate, separate from the myrosinase enzyme.  When an animal chews the plant, the allyl isothiocyanate is released, repelling the animal.  Human appreciation of the pungent is learnt, perhaps wrongly for some, as all condiments above mentioned are nephrotoxic.  This compound has recently been shown to strongly repel fire ants (Solenopsis invicta).  AITC vapor is also used as an antimicrobial and shelf life extender in food packaging.

Commercial and other applications
Allyl isothiocyanate is produced commercially by the reaction of allyl chloride and potassium thiocyanate:

CH2=CHCH2Cl + KSCN → CH2=CHCH2NCS + KCl

The product obtained in this fashion is sometimes known as synthetic mustard oil.  Allyl isothiocyanate can also be liberated by dry distillation of the seeds.  The product obtained in this fashion is known as volatile oil of mustard and is usually around 92% pure.  It is used principally as a flavoring agent in foods.  Synthetic allyl isothiocyanate is used as an insecticide, as an anti-mold agent   bacteriocide, and nematicide, and is used in certain cases for crop protection. It is also used in fire alarms for the deaf.

Hydrolysis of allyl isothiocyanate gives allylamine.

Safety
Allyl isothiocyanate has an LD50 of 151 mg/kg and is a lachrymator (similar to tear gas or mace).

Oncology
Based on in vitro experiments and animal models, allyl isothiocyanate exhibits many of the desirable attributes of a cancer chemopreventive agent.

See also 
Mustard plaster, traditional home remedy
Piperine, the active piquant chemical in black pepper
Capsaicin, the active piquant chemical in chili peppers
Allicin, the active piquant flavor chemical in raw garlic

References 

Antibiotics
Insecticides
Isothiocyanates
Pungent flavors
Nematicides
Allyl compounds
Lachrymatory agents